ATTACK! Books was an avant-pulp imprint of Creation Books founded in 1999. Partly a homage to the raw pulp writing of Richard Allen and the world of British action comics, part surrealism and part ultraviolence, the titles were overseen by former NME journalist Steven Wells, with the following anti-mission statement:

"This generation needs a NEW literature - writing that apes, matches, parodies and supersedes the flickeringly fast 900 MPH ATTACK! ATTACK! ATTACK! velocity of early 21st century popular culture at its most mEnTaL! We will publish writers who think they're rock stars, rock stars who think they're writers and we will make supernovas of the stuttering, wild-eyed, slack-jawed drooling idiot-geek geniuses who lurk in the fanzine/internet shadows...

"The self-perpetuating ponce-mafia oligarchy of effete bourgeois wankers who run the 'literary scene' must be swept aside by a tidal wave of screaming urchin tits-out teenage terror totty and DESTROYED! ATTACK! ATTACK! ATTACK!"

Titles included:
Get Your Cock Out - Mark Manning
Raiders Of The Low Forehead - Stanley Manly
Satan! Satan! Satan! - Tony White
Tits-Out Teenage Terror Totty - Steven Wells
Vatican Bloodbath - Tommy Udo
Whips & Furs: My Life as a bon-vivant, gambler & love rat by Jesus H. Christ - Stewart Home

ATTACK! was noted for its oppositionalist stance towards commercially successful authors of the day, especially Will Self.  The imprint folded in 2002 due to lack of funds.

References

External links
1999 feature
2001 feature
Steven Wells interviewed about ATTACK!

Book publishing companies of the United Kingdom